Clarence Joseph Bulliet (March 16, 1883 – October 20, 1952) was an American art critic and author.

Bulliet grew up in Corydon, Indiana and graduated in 1904 from Indiana University Bloomington. For nine years he pursued a journalism career in the city of Indianapolis. When Robert Mantell, the head of a Shakespearean touring theatre company, confessed that he liked Bulliet's theater reviews, Bulliet offered to become his press agent. Bulliet traveled in advance of the company throughout the United States and Canada during a period of nine years, except for one year when he was a regional "advance man" (publicist) for D. W. Griffith's silent film The Birth of a Nation (1915). After a brief return to newspaper journalism in Louisville, Kentucky, Bulliet moved to Chicago to edit Magazine of the Art World, a weekly periodical published by the Chicago Evening Post. Art criticism remained his primary occupation even after the Post was assimilated by the Chicago Daily News in 1932.

Bulliet played a central role in popularizing of modern art in the Midwestern United States, and in organizing Chicago's independent artists, who felt snubbed by the conservative tastes that dominated the Chicago Art Institute.

His first book, Robert Mantell's Romance, was published in 1918. His Apples and Madonnas (1927) gained great popularity as an introduction to modern art. Venus Castina (1928) was a pioneering work on female impersonation. The Courtesan Olympia explored relations between artists' models and mistresses. His most popular work was Art Masterpieces of the 1933 Worlds Fair Exhibited at the Art Institute of Chicago (1934). His last published book was The Significant Moderns and Their Pictures (1936).

He was married to southern Indiana artist Katherine Adams Bulliet; they had one son, Leander Jackson. After the death of his first wife in 1947 he married Catherine Girdler Bulliet. C. J. Bulliet is the grandfather of historian Richard Bulliet. For a time his lover was the painter Macena Barton, who once challenged his assertion that no woman had ever painted a worthwhile nude.

See also
List of critics
List of people from Indiana

References

External links
C. J. Bulliet papers, ca. 1888-1959 at the Archives of American Art

1883 births
1952 deaths
American art critics
American art historians
Indiana University Bloomington alumni
Journalists from Indiana
American male journalists
People from Corydon, Indiana
20th-century American historians
20th-century American male writers
Writers from Indianapolis
American male non-fiction writers